Horseshoe Mountain is a mountain just west of Mount Fleming, standing on the north side of the head of Taylor Glacier, near the edge of the polar plateau in Oates Land, Antarctica, close to its boundary with Victoria Land. It was discovered by the British National Antarctic Expedition, 1901–04, and so named because of its shape.

References

Mountains of Oates Land